Yary del Carmen Gebhardt Garduza (born 13 November 1976) is a Mexican politician affiliated with the Institutional Revolutionary Party. As of 2014 she served as Deputy of the LX Legislature of the Mexican Congress representing Chiapas.

References

1976 births
Living people
Politicians from Chiapas
Women members of the Chamber of Deputies (Mexico)
Institutional Revolutionary Party politicians
21st-century Mexican politicians
21st-century Mexican women politicians
Deputies of the LX Legislature of Mexico
Members of the Chamber of Deputies (Mexico) for Chiapas